Huangdian is a town under the administration of Lanxi City in western Zhejiang province, China, located  northwest of downtown Lanxi. , it has 46 villages under its administration.

Geography
Zhiyan Reservoir is a reservoir located in the town.

See also 
 List of township-level divisions of Zhejiang

References 

Township-level divisions of Zhejiang
Lanxi, Zhejiang